The Ministry of Wildlife Conservation and Tourism is a ministry of the Government of South Sudan. The incumbent minister is Rizig Zackaria Hassen, no deputy minister was name.[]

List of Ministers of Wildlife Conservation and Tourism

References

Environment of South Sudan
Wildlife Conservation and Tourism
South Sudan
South Sudan, Wildlife Conservation and Tourism